Vichitra Bandham is a 1972 Telugu-language drama film, produced by D. Madhusudhana Rao under the Annapurna Pictures banner and directed by Adurthi Subba Rao. It stars Akkineni Nageswara Rao and Vanisri, with music composed by K. V. Mahadevan. The film was based on the Yaddanapudi Sulochana Rani novel Vijetha.

Plot
Madhav and Sandhya are college mates. Sandhya is a daughter of an arrogant rich man, Aadi Narayana Rao. Once Madhav insults Sandhya before everyone in the college and to take revenge she fools Madhav with her act of love and in his rage of anger, Madhav kidnaps and molests her, as a result, Sandhya becomes pregnant. Sandhya's family is affected by this incident and her father kills himself, her brother becomes crippled and loses their entire wealth. She goes to reside in an ancient property in the village. Due to guilt, Madhav leaves for abroad, at that time Sandhya gives birth to a baby boy and puts the child in an orphanage. After few years, Madhav returns from abroad and he accidentally meets Sandhya in the village and learns the entire story. The rest of the story is what strange attachments develop and how their lives change.

Cast
Akkineni Nageswara Rao as Madhav 
Vanisri as Sandhya 
S. V. Ranga Rao as Aadi Narayana Rao 
V. Nagayya as Father Dayanidhi
Gummadi as Ahobila Rao
Satyanarayana as Akbar
Allu Ramalingaiah as Chalapathi 
Padmanabham as Chitti Babu 
Raja Babu as Babji
Bhanu Prakash as Gopal Rao 
Anjali Devi as Shanthamma
Suryakantam as Kantham 
Rama Prabha as Bhagyam
Radha Kumari as Kantham 
Lila Rani as Jyoti 
Y. Vijaya as Lilly

Crew
Art: G. V. Subba Rao
Choreography: Heeralal, Sundaram, Taara
Fights: Raghavulu
Dialogues: Acharya Aatreya 
Lyrics: Acharya Aatreya, Dasaradhi, Kosaraju
Playback: Ghantasala, V. Ramakrishna, P. Susheela
Music: K. V. Mahadevan
Story: Yaddanapudi Sulochana Rani
Editing: M. S. Mani
Cinematography:  P. S. Selvaraj
Producer: D. Madhusudhana Rao
Screenplay - Director: Adurthi Subba Rao
Banner: Annapurna Pictures
Release Date: 1972

Soundtrack

Music composed by K. V. Mahadevan. Music released on Audio Company.

Other
 VCDs and DVDs on - VOLGA Videos, Hyderabad

References

Indian drama films
Films scored by K. V. Mahadevan
Films based on Indian novels
Films directed by Adurthi Subba Rao
Films based on novels by Yaddanapudi Sulochana Rani
1972 drama films
1972 films